Fausto Rossi may refer to:

 Fausto Rossi (singer-songwriter) (born 1954), Italian singer-songwriter
 Fausto Rossi (footballer) (born 1990), Italian footballer